Sigrid Elviira Oulasmaa (13 October 1898 – 2 August 1963; née Salovaara) was a Finnish politician. She was born in Humppila, and was a Member of the Parliament of Finland from 1933 to 1936, representing the Small Farmers' Party of Finland.

References

1898 births
1963 deaths
People from Humppila
People from Häme Province (Grand Duchy of Finland)
Small Farmers' Party of Finland politicians
Members of the Parliament of Finland (1933–36)
Women members of the Parliament of Finland